Casey Cittadino is a consultant specializing in sales, marketing, and business development in addition to being a lacrosse player who played in the United States with the Denver Outlaws of Major League Lacrosse.

College career
Cittadino attended Towson University  where he received honorable mention All-American his senior year.
 Named to the All-Time Towson Team (top 50 players in school history)
 2nd all-time in Towson history for caused turnovers
 Two-time team captain: 2004-2006 seasons under head coach Tony Seaman
 Jack Heart Unsung Hero award; a prestigious award given to a single male athlete in honor of Jack Heart for selfless devotion to one’s teammates and coaching staff
 2005 Honorable Mention All-American
 Joseph Ferrante Scholar

References

Living people
1982 births